Crooked Lake is a lake located by Tully Center, New York. Fish species present in the lake include largemouth bass, yellow perch, and pumpkinseed sunfish. There is access via fee boat launch on the west shore off Long Road.

References

Lakes of New York (state)
Lakes of Onondaga County, New York